This is a list of labor unions in the United States. Unions exist to represent the interests of workers, who form the membership. Under US labor law, the National Labor Relations Act 1935 is the primary statute which gives US unions rights. The rights of members are governed by the Labor Management Reporting and Disclosure Act 1959. List Below

Largest unions

AFL-CIO

Strategic Organizing Center 

 International Brotherhood of Teamsters
 Graphic Communications Conference
 Brotherhood of Maintenance of Way Employes
 Brotherhood of Locomotive Engineers and Trainmen
 Service Employees International Union
 Workers United
 Colorado Workers for Innovations and New Solutions (WINS)
 United Farm Workers of America

Independent 
National
 Adult Performance Artists Guild
 Aircraft Mechanics Fraternal Association
 Allied Pilots Association
 Amazon Labor Union
 Association of Professional Flight Attendants
 Association of Western Pulp and Paper Workers
 Directors Guild of America
 Fraternal Order of Police
 Independent Pilots Association
 Industrial Workers of the World
 International Longshore and Warehouse Union
 International Union of Journeymen and Allied Trades
 Home Healthcare Workers of America
 National Organization of Industrial Trade Unions
 United Public Service Employees Union
 United Service Workers Union
 Jockeys' Guild
 Major League Baseball Players Association
 Major League Baseball Umpires Association
 National Alliance of Postal and Federal Employees
 National Basketball Coaches Association
 National Education Association
 National Emergency Medical Services Association
 National Hockey League Players' Association
 National Rural Letter Carriers' Association
 National Treasury Employees Union
 National Weather Service Employees Organization
 National Women's Soccer League Players Association
 National Writers Union
 Premier Hockey Federation Players' Association
 Professional Lacrosse Players' Association
 Southwest Airlines' Pilots Association
 Stage Directors and Choreographers Society
 United Brotherhood of Carpenters and Joiners of America
 United Electrical, Radio and Machine Workers of America
 United Independent Technology Technicians of America
 United Nurses and Allied Professionals
 United States Rugby Players Association
 U.S. National Soccer Team Players Association
 U.S. Women's National Team Players Association
 Writers Guild of America West

State and local
 Boston Police Patrolmen's Association
 Dallas Police Association
 Florida Police Benevolent Association
 Los Angeles
 Association for Los Angeles Deputy Sheriffs
 Los Angeles Police Protective League
 Los Angeles Sheriff's Professional Association
 United Firefighters of Los Angeles City
 New York City
 Detectives' Endowment Association
 Lieutenants Benevolent Association
 Police Benevolent Association of the City of New York
 Sergeants Benevolent Association
 San Francisco Police Officers Association
 State of Hawaii Organization of Police Officers

Professional sports labor unions

Union Reform Groups 
 Labor Notes
 Teamsters for a Democratic Union

See also 
 Labor unions in the United States
 List of trade unions in Canada
 List of trade unions in France
 List of trade unions in Germany
 List of trade unions in the United Kingdom
 United States labor law

Notes 

United States labor law
 
United States